Garabito is a canton in the Puntarenas province of Costa Rica. The head city is in Jacó district.

History 
Garabito was created on 25 September 1980 by decree 6512.

Geography 
Garabito has an area of  km2 and a mean elevation of  metres.

The canton lies along the north-central Pacific coast between Punta Loros near the town of Tivives and the mouth of the Tusubres River. The eastern boundary runs through the Fila Negra, a coastal mountain range.

Districts 
The canton of Garabito is subdivided into the following districts:
 Jacó
 Tárcoles

Demographics 

For the 2011 census, Garabito had a population of  inhabitants.

Transportation

Road transportation 
The canton is covered by the following road routes:

References 

Cantons of Puntarenas Province
Populated places in Puntarenas Province